Maine Central Railroad constructed a Foxcroft Branch in two stages after completing its main line from Portland to Bangor. The Dexter and Newport Railroad was completed in 1868 northward from Newport Junction on the Maine Central main line to Dexter. The completed railroad was leased by the Maine Central the following year.  An extension northward from Dexter to Foxcroft on the Piscataquis River was completed in 1889 as the Dexter and Piscataquis Railroad. The branch became a major pulpwood loading point through the 1970s; but was abandoned in 1990.

Railway mileposts
 Milepost 0: Newport Junction on the Maine Central main line
 Milepost 2.0: Camp Benson
 Milepost 7.0: Corinna agent's station
 Milepost 9.5: Lincoln's Mills
 Milepost 11.6: Moody's
 Milepost 15.3: Dexter agent's station
 Milepost 17.9: Lily Pond
 Milepost 20.0: Silver's Mills agent's station
 Milepost 22.5: West Dover
 Milepost 24.2: Starbird's
 Milepost 24.8: Sand Hills
 Milepost 29.5: Dover and Foxcroft agent's station

References

Notes

Predecessors of the Maine Central Railroad
Rail infrastructure in Maine
Transportation in Penobscot County, Maine
Dexter, Maine
Newport, Maine
Railway companies established in 1868
American companies established in 1868